Indonesian Protestant Church in Buol Toli-Toli is a Protestant Church group in Buol and Toli-Toli, Central Sulawesi, Indonesia. In the 19th century Europeans and Indonesians immigrated to this part of the island. The Minahasan ministers established the Protestant church. In 1937 the region was transferred to the Minahasan Church. Because the distance the church didn't remained in the Minahasan Church. In 1965 it became an independent denomination.
It has 200 congregations and 51 fellowships, and 23,000 members.
It is a member of the World Communion of Reformed Churches.

References

External links 
Official website 

Central Sulawesi
Members of the World Communion of Reformed Churches
Reformed denominations in Indonesia